Rheumatoid factor (RF) is the autoantibody that was first found in rheumatoid arthritis. It is defined as an antibody against the Fc portion of IgG and different RFs can recognize different parts of the IgG-Fc. RF and IgG join to form immune complexes that contribute to the disease process.

Rheumatoid factor can also be a cryoglobulin (antibody that precipitates on cooling of a blood sample); it can be either type 2 (monoclonal IgM to polyclonal IgG) or type 3 (polyclonal IgM to polyclonal IgG) cryoglobulin.

Although predominantly encountered as IgM, rheumatoid factor can be of any isotype of immunoglobulins, i.e. IgA, IgG, IgM, IgE, IgD.

Testing
RF is tested by collecting blood in a plain tube (5 mL is often enough). The serum is tested for the presence of RF. There are different methods available, which include nephelometry, turbidimetry, agglutination of gamma globulin-coated latex particles or erythrocytes. RF is often evaluated in patients suspected of having any form of arthritis even though positive results can be due to other causes, and negative results do not rule out disease. But, in combination with signs and symptoms, it can play a role in both diagnosis and disease prognosis. It is part of the usual disease criteria of rheumatoid arthritis.

The presence of rheumatoid factor in serum can also indicate the occurrence of suspected autoimmune activity unrelated to rheumatoid arthritis, such as that associated with tissue or organ rejection. In such instances, RF may serve as one of several serological markers for autoimmunity. The sensitivity of RF for established rheumatoid arthritis is only 60-70% with a specificity of 78%.

Rheumatoid factor is part of the 2010 ACR/EULAR classification criteria for Rheumatoid Arthritis. RF positivity combines well with anti-CCP and/or 14-3-3η (YWHAH) to inform diagnosis.  RF positivity at baseline has also been described as a good prognostic marker for future radiographic damage.

Interpretation
High levels of rheumatoid factor (in general, above 20 IU/mL, 1:40, or over the 95th percentile; there is some variation among labs) occur in rheumatoid arthritis (present in 80%) and Sjögren's syndrome (present in 70%). The higher the level of RF the greater the probability of destructive articular disease. It is also found in Epstein–Barr virus or Parvovirus infection and in 5 to 10% of healthy persons, especially the elderly.

There is an association between rheumatoid factor and more persistently active synovitis, more joint damage, greater eventual disability and arthritis.

Other than in rheumatoid arthritis, rheumatoid factor may also be elevated in other conditions, including:
 Systemic lupus erythematosus (SLE)
 Sjögren syndrome
 Hepatitis B and C, herpes, HIV, and other viral infections
 Primary biliary cirrhosis
 Infectious mononucleosis and any chronic viral infection
 Leprosy
 Sarcoidosis
 Tuberculosis, Syphilis and other chronic bacterial infections
 Visceral leishmaniasis
 Malaria and other parasitic infections
 Cancer

History
The test was first described by Norwegian Dr Erik Waaler in 1940 and redescribed by Dr Harry M. Rose and colleagues in 1948. Redescription is said to be due to the uncertainties due to World War II. It is still referred to as the Waaler-Rose test.

References

External links
 RF on MedlinePlus
 Rheumatoid Factor on Lab Tests Online
 
 Rheumatoid Factor on WebMD

Autoantibodies
Rheumatology